Dəlləkli (also, Dellekli and Dellyakli) is a village in the Tovuz Rayon of Azerbaijan.  The village forms part of the municipality of Qəribli.

References 

Populated places in Tovuz District